The Top Division Men One (TDM1), also known as the Belgian Second Division or the Tweede Nationale, is the second level of men's basketball in Belgium and the highest amateur level in Flanders. 

The league features 14 teams and the champion has the right to promote to the Pro Basketball League (PBL).

Teams
 Oxaco (Boechout)
 Gembo (Borgerhout)
 Gent Hawks (Ghent)
 Basket Waregem (Waregem)
 CUVA Houthalen (Houthalen)
 Soba Antwerpen (Antwerp)
 Royal IV Brussels (Brussels)
 Guco Lier
 Melsele BBC (Melsele)
 Gistel-Oostende (Gistel / Ostend)
 BC Ninane (Ninane)
 Melco Ieper (Ypres)
 BBC Ekeren (Ekeren)
 Royal Anderlecht Basket (Anderlecht)

Champions

References

2
Belgium